Te Kakapi-o-te-rangi Te Wharepōuri (? – 22 November 1842) was a notable New Zealand tribal leader. Of Māori descent, he identified with the Te Āti Awa iwi.

References

1842 deaths
Te Āti Awa people
Year of birth missing